Anthony (Tony) Andersen is a Labrador Inuit politician who serves on the Nunatsiavut Assembly.

Personal life 
He was born to Edgar Andersen and Muriel Andersen. His brother Wally Andersen is also currently a member of the Nunatsiavut Assembly and so is his nephew Thomas Evans. His niece Lela Evans was elected to the House of Assembly of Newfoundland and Labrador in 2019, defeating his nephew Randy Edmunds.

Career 
Andersen briefly served as President of Nunatsiavut following the resignation of William Andersen III. He has also served as the AngajukKâk of Nain.

He replaced Kate Mitchell as First Minister of Nunatsiavut after her resignation. Andersen is one of 2 members of the Nunatsiavut Assembly that represents Nain.

In 2022, Andersen was permanently appointed as First Minister following a general election.

References 

Living people
Year of birth missing (living people)
Inuit politicians
Indigenous leaders in Atlantic Canada
21st-century Canadian politicians
Inuit from Newfoundland and Labrador
First Ministers of Nunatsiavut